Submarine Commander is a 1982 sports video game developed by Atari for the Atari 2600 and released under the Sears Tele-Games label.

Development
The game was one of three developed by Atari exclusively for Sears, the others being Stellar Track and Steeplechase. It was based on the Midway arcade game Sea Wolf II that was played with a periscope.

Gameplay
The player controls a submarine going through enemy territory. The player must shoot targets in order to win the game. The player views the action via a periscope that can be rotated through 360 degrees - a rarity for the time. Information provided to the player includes a radar scope, a depth-charge-detector, a fuel gauge, and an engine temperature gauge for detecting engine-overheating. There are eight modes of play, made up of single and two-player mode and four different levels of difficulty for each.

Reception
A December 1982 review in Joystik magazine described Submarine Commander as being a "very basic shooting-gallery type game." 

A review on the 8-Bit Central website criticised the graphics saying that the game was "not a visually pleasing experience" but also said that the game was "worth trying" due to the complexity of the gameplay. The 8-Bit Central gave the game 2.5/5 overall. A December 2012 review on the Video Games Critic website was praising of the game, describing it as "an eye-opening experience" and praising the faux-3D graphics and exciting actionof the game, and gave it a grade of "B+" overall.

References

1982 video games
Atari 2600 games
Shoot 'em ups
Submarine simulation video games
Video games developed in the United States